Chase Sexton (born September 23, 1999) is an American motorcycle racer who rides for Honda Racing Corporation HRC in the 450cc Championship in AMA Supercross.

Sexton was a well known rookie, earning the 2016 AMA Nicky Hayden Amateur Horizon Award, and was the 2018 Monster Energy AMA Supercross Rookie of the year.

Career
Sexton won back to back AMA Supercross 250cc East Championships for Geico Honda in 2019 and 2020. 

In 2022, upon moving up to the 450cc class, Sexton gained his first premier class victory in San Diego in round 3 of the 2022 AMA Supercross Championship. In AMAmotocross, Sexton battled multi-time champion Eli Tomac until the very last round, narrowly missing out on his first premier 450cc class title by 7 points.

He was also a member of the USA MXON team in 2022, where they finished 1st place.

References 
	

1999 births
Living people
American motorcycle racers